Persatuan Sepakbola Banjarbaru (simply known as Persebaru) is an Indonesian football club based in Banjarbaru, the capital city of South Kalimantan. They currently competes in Liga 3.

References

External links
 

Football clubs in Indonesia
Football clubs in South Kalimantan
Sport in South Kalimantan